The Case of "Dead Souls" is a 2005 Russian television miniseries directed by Pavel Lungin loosely based on various stories by Nikolai Gogol, including Dead Souls.

Plot
The collegiate registrar Ivan Shiller (Pavel Derevyanko) is sent to the provincial city of N to investigate the disappearance of fraudster Pavel Ivanovich Chichikov (Konstantin Khabensky) from prison. He is obstructed by city officials who are led by Governor A.A. Skvoznik-Dmukhanovsky (Sergei Garmash). After going through the investigation through a series of meetings of strange encounters, Schiller himself turns into Chichikov in the finale...

Cast 
 Pavel Derevyanko - Ivan Afanasievich Shiller
 Konstantin Khabensky - Pavel Ivanovich Chichikov / tailor
 Sergei Garmash - Anton Antonovich Skvoznik-Dmukhanovsky, Governor
 Nina Usatova - Anna Andreevna, wife of the governor
 Sergei Kolesnikov - bailiff Christian Stepanovich Derzhimorda
 Alexander Abdulov - Nozdryov
 Victor Abrosimov - Prosecutor
 Viktor Verzhbitsky - Leonty Vasilievich Dubbel
 Vladimir Simonov - Alexander von Benckendorff
 Roman Madyanov - Postmaster Ivan Kuzmich Shpekin
 Alexander Semchev - Sobakevich
 Leonid Yarmolnik - Plyushkin
 Anna Ardova - Marfa Semyonovna, housekeeper
 Andrei Bronnikov - Father Foma
 Elena Galibina - Nastasya Petrovna Korobochka
 Alexander Ilyin - Judge Ammos Fedorovich Lyapkin-Tyapkin
 Maxim Konovalov - Gregory, servant
 Yuri Nifontov - Artemy Filippovich Zemlyannika, trustee of god-friendly institutions
 Inga Strelkova-Oboldina - Marya Antonovna, daughter of the governor
 Galina Petrova - Pulcheria Ivanovna
 Vladimir Salnikov - Afanasy Ivanovich
 Sergey Serov - Ivan Lazarevich Svistunov
 Peter Soldatov - Captain Kopeikin
 Daniil Spivakovsky - Pyotr Ivanovich Bobchinsky
 Ivan Agapov - Pyotr Ivanovich Dobchinsky
 Mikhail Tserishenko - owner of the hotel
 Yevgenia Dmitrieva - Lizanka, the wife of Manilov
 Pavel Lyubimtsev - Manilov
 Maria Sokova - Feodulia Ivanovna, wife of Sobakevich
 Andrey Batukhanov - archivist
 Daria Belousova - street girl
 Sergey Epishev - sergeant / sentry
 Olga Lapshina - Shpekin's wife
 Dmitry Prokofiev - Stepan
 Tatiana Yakovenko - Lizaveta
 Roman Hardykov - judicial official

References

External links

NTV (Russia) original programming
Russian fantasy television series
Films based on works by Nikolai Gogol
Russian television miniseries
2005 Russian television series debuts
2005 Russian television series endings
2000s Russian television series
Films directed by Pavel Lungin